Anil Mohile (1940 - 2012) was an Indian music composer and music arranger.

Music career 
Mohile composed music for several movies including Marathi and Hindi Films. He had worked closely with Lata Mangeshkar for many years. He arranged music for 85 films, including Amitabh Bachchan starrers Sharaabi and Don.

He also composed music with Arun Paudwal as a duo 'Anil-Arun'. Anuradha Paudwal had sung many songs under the composition of this music composer pair.

He died on Wednesday,1 February 2012 morning, at his residence in Andheri, after suffering a massive heart attack. He was 71-year-old and is survived by his wife, daughter and son, Amar.

Hindi films done as music arranger 
 Qayamat Se Qayamat Tak
 Sharaabi
 Lekin
 Don
 Thodisi Bewafaii

Marathi films done as music arranger 
 Zapatlela
 De Danadan
 Dhadakebaj
 Thartharat
 Shubh Mangal Savdhan
 Ashi Hi Banwa Banwi
 Jiwlaga
 Zapatlela
 maherachi saadi

References

External links
 

Year of birth missing
1991 deaths
Indian film score composers